The King of Freedom World Championship, also referred to as the , is a professional wrestling championship created and promoted by the Japanese promotion Pro Wrestling Freedoms. It is the top title of the company and is usually disputed in deathmatches.

Title history
There have been a total of seventeen reigns shared between nine different champions and one vacancy. The current champion is Violento Jack who is in his third reign.

Combined reigns 

See also
King of Freedom World Junior Heavyweight Championship

References 

Openweight wrestling championships
World professional wrestling championships